The name Lando was used for three tropical cyclones in the Philippines by PAGASA in the Western Pacific Ocean. It replaced the name Lakay after 2003.

 Typhoon Hagibis (2007) (T0724, 24W, Lando) – an erratic, late-season typhoon which traversed the Philippines twice.
 Tropical Depression Lando (2011) – a weak and short-lived system which was only recognized by PAGASA and JMA.
 Typhoon Koppu (2015) (T1525, 24W, Lando) – a strong typhoon that struck the Philippines, claiming 62 lives and inflicting a damage total worth ₱14.4 billion (US$313 million).

The name Lando was retired by PAGASA after the 2015 season and was replaced by Liwayway.

Pacific typhoon set index articles